The 1971 Kansas City Royals season was their third in Major League Baseball. The Royals had the first winning season (85-76) in franchise history, good enough for second place in the American League West and 16 games behind the Oakland Athletics. Kansas City earning a winning record in its third season was the second fastest of any expansion club in Major League Baseball history up to that point, the 1962 Los Angeles Angels achieved a winning record in their second season. The record would stand until the 1999 Arizona Diamondbacks won the National League West title in their second season.

Offseason 
 February 2, 1971: Ellie Rodríguez was traded by the Royals to the Milwaukee Brewers for Carl Taylor.
 Prior to 1971 season: Gary Lance was signed as an amateur free agent by the Royals.

Regular season

Season standings

Record vs. opponents

Notable transactions 
 May 11, 1971: Tom Matchick was traded by the Royals to the Milwaukee Brewers for Ted Savage.
 June 8, 1971: George Brett was drafted by the Royals in the 2nd round of the 1971 Major League Baseball draft.

Roster

Player stats

Batting

Starters by position 
Note: Pos = Position; G = Games played; AB = At bats; H = Hits; Avg. = Batting average; HR = Home runs; RBI = Runs batted in

Other batters 
Note: G = Games played; AB = At bats; H = Hits; Avg. = Batting average; HR = Home runs; RBI = Runs batted in

Pitching

Starting pitchers 
Note: G = Games pitched; IP = Innings pitched; W = Wins; L = Losses; ERA = Earned run average; SO = Strikeouts

Other pitchers 
Note: G = Games pitched; IP = Innings pitched; W = Wins; L = Losses; ERA = Earned run average; SO = Strikeouts

Relief pitchers 
Note: G = Games pitched; W = Wins; L = Losses; SV = Saves; ERA = Earned run average; SO = Strikeouts

Farm system 

LEAGUE CHAMPIONS: Elmira, GCL Royals

Notes

References 
1971 Kansas City Royals at Baseball Reference
1971 Kansas City Royals at Baseball Almanac

Kansas City Royals seasons
Kansas City Royals season
Kansas City